Ocee may refer to two locations in the United States:

 Ocee, Georgia
 Ocee, Texas